On 18 May 2004, four people were massacred at Lahsuna village in Bihar state of India.

Members of the People's War Group, an outlawed naxal group, were accused of the crime. About 100 armed members of the group reportedly dragged the victims out of their homes and killed them for casting their votes in favour of Janata Dal (United).

The victims were identified as Uday Paswan, Naga Paswan, Vijay Paswan and Sarwan Paswan.

In 2008, three members of the group were found guilty of the killings and were awarded capital punishment by a court in Patna.

References

2004 murders in India
Massacres in India
Massacres in 2004
Naxalite–Maoist insurgency